The Federal University of São Paulo (UNIFESP) is a university in the state of São Paulo, Brazil.

Until 2005, UNIFESP was exclusively for Health Sciences, but after that year the university became multisubject due to Brazilian Federal Government's University Reform Program (REUNI). Now, the university has six campuses, the oldest in Vila Clementino, in São Paulo (Health) and four more in Guarulhos (Humanities area), Diadema (Science, Engineering and related), Santos (Health, Marine Sciences), São José dos Campos (Computational and Engineering fields) and Osasco (Business and related). New campus is planned in Santo Amaro, a district of (São Paulo).

Despite the recent expansion, UNIFESP is considered one of the most prestigious universities in the country, attracting students from all over Brazil and neighboring countries.

Courses offered
Campus Vila Clementino (São Paulo) - founded in 1933 as Paulista School of Medicine

Medicine since 1933
Nursing - 1939
Biomedicine - 1966
Fonaudiology - 1969
Health Technologies - Ophthalmology - 2008 (1962 as Ophthalmology)
Health Technologies - Radiology - 2008
Health Technologies - Health Informatics) - 2010

Campus Baixada Santista - founded in 2006
Nutrition - 2006
Physical therapy - 2006
Physical education - 2006
Psychology - 2006
Occupational therapy - 2006
Social work - 2009
Interdisciplinary bachelor in Marine Sciences - 2012

Campus Guarulhos - founded in 2007
History - 2007
Social sciences - 2007
Philosophy - 2007
Pedagogy - 2007
History of Art - 2009
Letras(Portuguese and English/French/Spanish  - 2009)

Campus Diadema - founded in 2007
Chemistry - 2007
Chemical Engineering - 2007
Pharmacy - 2007
Biology - 2007
Industrial Chemistry - 2009
Sciences - Licenciature (Licentiate Degree): Physics, Mathematics, Biology and Chemistry - 2010
Environmental Sciences - 2010

Campus São José dos Campos - founded in 2007
Computer Science - 2007
Computational Mathematics - 2009
Bachelor of Science and Technology - 2011
Materials Engineering - 2011
Biomedical Engineering - 2011
Biotechnology Engineering - 2015
Computer Engineering - 2015

Campus  Osasco - founded in 2011
Actuarial Science
Business Administration
Accounting
Economics
International relations

See also
Brazil university rankings
Universities and higher education in Brazil

References

External links

 

Federal universities of Brazil
Medical schools in Brazil
Universities and colleges in São Paulo
Educational institutions established in 1933
1933 establishments in Brazil